Euphaedra ravola, the Ravola Ceres forester, is a butterfly in the family Nymphalidae. It is found in Nigeria, Cameroon, the Democratic Republic of the Congo and possibly Ivory Coast and Ghana. The habitat consists of forests.

Both sexes are attracted to fallen fruit.

The larvae are gregarious.  They are chocolate brown with sulphur-yellow lateral processes.

Similar species
Other members of the Euphaedra ceres species group q.v.

References

Butterflies described in 1866
ravola
Butterflies of Africa
Taxa named by William Chapman Hewitson